National Chengchi University is a public research university in Taipei. The university is also considered as the earliest public service training facility of the Republic of China. First established in Nanjing in 1927, the university was subsequently relocated to Taipei in 1954. It is considered to be one of the most prestigious and prominent universities in Taiwan. The university, abbreviated as NCCU, specializes in arts and humanities, mass media, linguistics and literature, social sciences, economics, management, politics, and international affairs programs. It is the only publicly funded university in Taiwan which provides courses in journalism, advertising, radio and television, diplomacy, and several languages which are not taught at other institutions in Taiwan. The name Chengchi means governance or politics, and refers to its founding in 1927 as a training institution for senior civil service for the Nanjing Nationalist government of the Republic of China. The university has strong ties with academic institutions like Academia Sinica, National Yang Ming Chiao Tung University, National Taiwan University and National Palace Museum. 

NCCU is also a member of the University System of Taiwan and University Alliance in Talent Education Development (UAiTED)
.

History

The school was established in 1927 in Nanjing, which was the capital city of China, as the Nationalist Party of China's Central School of Party Affairs. In 1929, it was renamed to Central School of Governance, after the Kuomintang reunified China in the Northern Expedition campaign. The school was built on the basis of National Central University in Nanjing, which was the highest academic institution of the Republic of China. In 1946, it merged with the Central School of Cadre, which was founded in 1944 by the Youth Corps of Three People's Principles in Chongqing. The merged school was named the National Central University of Governance, based in Nanjing. When the Nationalist government lost control of mainland China in 1949, the university's activities were suspended.

The university was reopened in 1954 as National Chengchi University in Taipei by the Executive Yuan, in order to meet the needs of civil service and the growing demands of higher education in Taiwan. Initially only graduate students were admitted, later in 1955, the school started to offer places to undergraduate students. In 1960, the university awarded the very first Doctor of Juridical Science degree in the Republic of China. In 1964, the school initiated the first-ever Mandarin-based Chinese Master of Business Administration program in the world.

Traditionally, as a modern institution training for public servants, NCCU is considered one of the leading institutions of the Republic of China. Today, the school is one of the top universities in Taiwan, and it also has been elected as the "Aim for the Top University Project" sponsored school of the Ministry of Education.

In 2014, the Embassy of Japan in Taiwan listed NCCU as one of the seven well-known Taiwanese universities.

In December 2019, NCCU has established its first overseas office in Bangkok, Thailand.

Organization

NCCU has eleven colleges, including colleges of Commerce, Communication, Foreign Languages and Literature, Education, International Affairs, Law, Liberal Arts, Science, Social Sciences, International Innovation, and Informatics, encompassing 34 departments and 48 graduate institutes.

 The College of Commerce is ranked as a top business school by Eduniversal and is accredited by the Association to Advance Collegiate Schools of Business and the European Quality Improvement System. In addition, the college is a member of The Partnership in International Management.
 The College of Foreign Languages and Literature offers distinctive academic programs on Slavic languages and literature, Arabic languages and literature and Turkish language and culture. Arabic languages and literature and Turkish language and culture are the faculties which exist only in NCCU in Taiwan. Dual degrees in Korean language with Sungkyunkwan University and Hanyang University have been offered since 2013. The college also is awarded by the Academy of Korean Studies for the "Core University Program for Korean Studies" and receive support from the government of the Republic of Korea.
 The College of International Affairs is affiliated with the Association of Professional Schools of International Affairs, with specializations in international relations, East Asian studies and Russian studies.
 The Institute of International Relations is one of the top think tanks in the Asia-Pacific area.
 Founded together with University of Michigan, the Center for Public and Business Administration Education provides training for managers in public and private institutions.
 The Department of Diplomacy is the only one of its kind in a university in Taiwan.
 NCCU has recently engaged in the fields of information technology and natural science cooperating with Academia Sinica, National Tsinghua University, and the Ministry of Finance.
 In addition to accredited educational partnerships, NCCU students have access to multiple industry partnerships for internships and on-the-job learning.

Campuses

NCCU's main campus is in the Wenshan District, in the southern part of Taipei. NCCU was awarded the first prize in the Taipei Urban Landscape Award for its campus planning by the city government of Taipei.

Apart from the main campus, there are two branch campuses: 
The Public & Business Administration Education Center on Jinhua Street in Daan District.
The Institute of International Relations on Wanshou Road.
The affiliated schools are:
Preschool on Section 2, Zhinan Road.
Experimental Elementary School on Section 3, Zhinan Road.
The Affiliated High School on Zhengda First Street.

One campus under construction:
 Zhinan Village, a former Ministry of Defense campus.

Libraries, exhibition space, and sports centers

There are six Libraries on the main campus and one library in the Center for Public and Business Affairs Education.

Libraries
Chiang Kai-shek Library
College of Commerce Library
College of Social Science Library
College of Communication Library
Institute of International Relation Library
Dah Hsian Seetoo Library
Social Science Information Canter and Sun Yat-sen Memorial Library
Center for Public and Business Affairs Education Library (Under construction)

Museum and Arts Center
Siwei Tang Auditorium
Museum of Ethnology
NCCU Arts Center
Exhibition of Future Planning at Main Research Center
Roman Forum

Sports Centers
Main Sports Center
Swimming Center
Tennis Court
Track and Field Stadium
Riverside Park
Health Park
Sports Park

Campus media

There are an academic press, a community radio station, and a local newspaper agency located in NCCU.
Chengchi University Press
Voice of NCCU
University News

Partnership with the Health Care System

In cooperation with the Taipei City Hospital System and National Yang Ming Chiao Tung University, the three institutions formed a Health Care system covering up medical education, healthcare, and management.

NCCU Health Building
Ground Level: Taipei City Hospital ChengDa Clinic
Second Level: NCCU healthcare center
Third Level: NCCU consulting center

International programs
NCCU provides a series of international programs taught in English:
 International Master's Program of Business Administration (IMBA)
 International Master's Program in Asia-Pacific Studies (IMAS)
 International Doctoral Program in Asia-Pacific Studies (IDAS)
 International Master's Program in International Communication Studies (IMICS)
 International Master's Program in International Studies (IMPIS)
 International Master Program of Applied Economics and Social Development (IMES)
 Global Governance Program

NCCU participates in the Social Networks and Human-Centered Computing Program of the Taiwan International Graduate Program of Academia Sinica, Taiwan's most preeminent academic research institution.

Alumni

Many NCCU alumni holds prominent positions in the fields of politics, finance, academics, and arts. One Vice President of the Republic of China (Taiwan), as well as one Premier of the Republic of China, one Governor of Taiwan Province graduated from NCCU. At least 4 Academicians of Academia Sinica were educated at NCCU. NCCU alumni also include Olympic Games gold medalists.

Notable alumni
Vincent Siew: Vice President of the Republic of China (2008-2012)
Lin Chuan: Premier of the Republic of China (2016-17)
Yang Chin-long: Governor of the Central Bank of the Republic of China
Huang Tien-mu: Chair of the Financial Supervisory Commission of the Republic of China
Lee Yung-te: Minister of Culture of the Republic of China
James Soong: Governor of Taiwan Province (1993-98)
Lu Shiow-yen: Mayor of Taichung City
Ovid Tzeng: Linguist, Academicians of Academia Sinica, Minister of Education of the Republic of China (2000-02)
Ambrose King: Sociologist, Academicians of Academia Sinica, Vice-Chancellor of the Chinese University of Hong Kong (2002-04)
Chang Yu-sheng: Singer
Matilda Tao: Singer, TV host
Sandee Chan: Golden Melody Award winning singer and producer
Cheer Chen: Singer
Ariel Lin: Actress

Alumni Network
NCCU has several hubs globally for students and teachers of NCCU to stay in touch and connect with each other. In 2020, the world alumni association has been established to serve about 140,000 alumni globally.

Head of state and NCCU

President of the Republic of China
Chiang Kai-shek: Founder president of the university.
Chiang Ching-kuo: Executive of Central School of Cadre.
Lee Teng-hui: Lecturer of Graduate Institute of East Asian Studies.
Ma Ying-jeou: Associate Professor of Department of Law
Tsai Ing-wen: Associate Professor of Department of Law

Vice President of the Republic of China
Li Yuan-tsu: Class of 1946, Central School of Governance
Vincent Siew: Class of 1965, Department of Diplomacy

Partnership
NCCU is a member institution of University System of Taiwan. Globally, NCCU has maintained partnership with more than 470 academic institutions, including exchange students programs, visiting scholar programs, and academic cooperation programs. The partner institutions are in the following countries:

See also
Central Party School of the Chinese Communist Party
 Tsinghua Big Five Alliance
Chinese Academy of Governance
Chinese Communist Party
Kuomintang
Nanjing Library
Nanjing University
Renmin University of China
Republic of China Military Academy
Second Historical Archives of China

References

External links

NCCU Massive Open Online Courses
National Chengchi University, at ResearchGate

 
Comprehensive universities in Taiwan
Universities and colleges in Taipei
1954 establishments in Taiwan
Educational institutions established in 1954
Teachers colleges
Public administration schools